Richard Violet (1965–1997), known professionally as Jack Taylor, was an American musician and member of several popular bands.

He was born in Urbana, Ohio. In his early twenties he played guitar with The Gibson Bros and went on to form the Columbus, Ohio, avant-garde noise band Monster Truck Five. Late in his career he fronted, with Jeffrey Evans, the Memphis rock n roll act the '68 Comeback and appeared in, and provided the title song for, the John Michael McCarthy film The Sore Losers. He died in 1997 of an overdose.

References
 grunnenrocks
 hemisphere
 Gaunt

1965 births
1997 deaths
American rock guitarists
American male guitarists
American rock musicians
People from Urbana, Ohio
20th-century American guitarists
Guitarists from Ohio
20th-century American male musicians